Lawrence Edward Watkin (December 9, 1901 – December 16, 1981) was an American writer and film producer. He was known primarily as a scriptwriter for a series of 1950s Walt Disney films.

Life
Watkin was born in Camden (town), New York in 1901. He died in 1981, a few days after his 80th birthday, in San Joaquin County, California.

Writer
Watkin was an English professor at Washington and Lee University in Lexington, Virginia. His first novel, On Borrowed Time, published in 1937, remains his best known work. It won the National Book Award as Bookseller Discovery of 1937, voted by members of the American Booksellers Association.
It was dramatized in 1938 by Paul Osborn for a successful run on Broadway. A Hollywood film version with Lionel Barrymore and Sir Cedric Hardwicke followed in 1939.

His next novel, Geese in the Forum (1940), was an allegory about university structures.

In 1947 Walt Disney hired Watkin to adapt the stories of Herminie Templeton Kavanagh featuring Darby O'Gill.  The project was finally realized in 1959 as Darby O'Gill and the Little People. By that time, Watkin had written numerous other screenplays for Disney.  The first of his Disney screenplays was Treasure Island (1950), adapted from the Robert Louis Stevenson novel.  Three screenplays followed (Beaver Valley, The Story of Robin Hood and His Merrie Men, and The Sword and the Rose), which were produced by Disney in Great Britain. The popular Disney television serials Spin and Marty  (1955–1957) were adapted by Jackson Gillis from Watkin's 1942 book Marty Markham. Watkin was producer of Disney's 1956 Adventure film,  The Great Locomotive Chase.

In the late 1960s Watkin was hired by the Disney Studio to do a biography of Walt Disney after the first effort by Richard G. Hubler was judged unsatisfactory. Watkin's effort was also deemed unsuitable; he told friends the biography was "ill-fated" because it was "too truthful". Disney historian Wade Sampson, after reading the unpublished manuscript, dubbed it "achingly boring, with only occasional insights into the life and genius of Walt Disney and merely listing the Disney productions rather than the stories behind those productions."

Works

Novels 
 On Borrowed Time, New York and London 1937
 Geese in the Forum, New York and London 1940
 Thomas Jones and His Nine Lives, New York 1941
 Gentleman from England, New York 1941
 Marty Markham, New York 1942 . The novel can be viewed at https://archive.org/details/waltdisneysspinm00watk
 Darby O’Gill and the Little People, New York 1959

Screenplays 
 Keeper of the Bees (1947)
Treasure Island (1950) – Originally by Robert Louis Stevenson
Beaver Valley; aka In Beaver Valley (1950) - documentary short
 The Story of Robin Hood and His Merrie Men, aka The Story of Robin Hood (1952)
 The Sword and the Rose; aka When Knighthood Was in Flower (1953)  – based on the novel by Charles Major
Rob Roy, the Highland Rogue (1953
The Great Locomotive Chase (1956) - Producer and Writer
The Light in the Forest (1958)  – Originally by Conrad Richter
 Darby O'Gill and the Little People (1959)  – Originally by Herminie Templeton Kavanagh
 Ten Who Dared (1960)
National Velvet - "The Desperado" (1961)
The Robert Taylor Show (1963)
The Virginian - "Portrait of a Widow" (1964)
 The Biscuit Eater (1972)

References

Further reading
Lawrence Edward Watkin. Larry Watkin: A Memoir of an American Man of Letters. Pulp Hero Press, 2018.

External links 

"Cinchset" background history on Lawrence Edward Watkin's writing of the Marty Markham story
 Lawrence Edward Watkin at Library of Congress Authorities — with 9 catalog records

1901 births
1981 deaths
20th-century American novelists
American male novelists
American male screenwriters
National Book Award winners
Novelists from New York (state)
Writers from New York City
Washington and Lee University faculty
Novelists from Virginia
Screenwriters from Virginia
Screenwriters from New York (state)
20th-century American male writers
20th-century American screenwriters